Chen Lulu (born ) is a Chinese female  track cyclist. She won the gold medal in the  team pursuit  at the 2016 Asian Cycling Championships.

Major Results
2016
1st  Team Pursuit, Asian Track Championships (with Huang Dong Yan, Ma Menglu and Wang Hong)

References

External links
 Profile at cyclingarchives.com

1997 births
Living people
Chinese track cyclists
Chinese female cyclists
Place of birth missing (living people)
21st-century Chinese women